The Wynyard Walk is a  pedestrian link and tunnel between Wynyard station and Barangaroo in the Sydney central business district. The walkway was officially opened on 20 September 2016. Wynyard Walk provides a quick and safe route and has increased the entry and exit capacity of Wynyard station to meet demand as Barangaroo is redeveloped. An estimated 20,000 pedestrians per hour can walk through the tunnel. In 2009, prior to construction of Barangaroo, the pedestrian tunnel was estimated to cost $100 million.

Construction

The project involved the construction of:
a five-storey entry building to Wynyard station (three storeys below ground and two above) 
a pedestrian bridge over Sussex Street
a public plaza area, Napoleon Plaza to provide an upgraded pedestrian precinct

The construction contract was awarded to Thiess in September 2012. In early 2014, construction at the Western Portal was put on hold to allow archaeologists to work on the site to preserve significant European and indigenous artefacts unearthed during excavation.

On 19 October 2015, a new pedestrian bridge over Sussex Street was opened. It provided a route onto the Napoleon Bridge directly into Barangaroo from Westpac Place behind the Sussex Hotel. While some construction of the Clarenc e Street entrance and minor finishes on Wynyard Walk continued until late 2016, the tunnel is open 24 hours per day.

Following the completion of the walk, the plaza formerly known as Wynyard Plaza was renamed as the Napoleon Plaza in honour of the French convict and prominent Sydney developer, Francis Girard.

Adjoining Buildings 
The Wynyard Walk connects pedestrians from Barangaroo through to Wynyard station - and continues through Wynyard Place (with exits on George Street) and on to the Hunter Connection (with exits on Pitt Street and Hunter Street).

The thoroughfare to George Street was rebuilt as part of the Wynyard Place development.

See also
 Transport in Sydney
 Architecture of Sydney

References

Tunnels in Sydney
Tunnels completed in 2016
2016 establishments in Australia